Ramnarayan Rawat (also spelled Ram Narayan Rawat and Ram Rawat) is a professor at the University of Delaware and a historian of the Indian subcontinent and has also had appointments at the University of Pennsylvania (as a postdoctoral scholar) and University of Washington. He received his B.A. and Ph.D. from the University of Delhi. He has conducted research on the Chamar caste in India, and displayed that their work centered on agriculture and not tanning as previously thought. His work was banned in parts of India for some time due to usage of the word "Chamar."

References

University of Delaware faculty
American political scientists
Delhi University alumni
Historians of India
Living people
Year of birth missing (living people)